Marianne, Dowager Princess of Sayn-Wittgenstein-Sayn, (born Baroness Marianne von Mayr-Melnhof; 9 December 1919) is a German noble, the mother of Alexander, 7th Prince zu Sayn-Wittgenstein-Sayn (born 1943).

Biography
Marianne was born on 9 December 1919 in Salzburg, the eldest daughter of Baron Friedrich Mayr von Melnhof (1892–1956), owner of the Glanegg Castle near Salzburg, and his wife, Countess Maria-Anna von Meran (1897–1983), granddaughter of Franz, Count of Meran, head of a morganatic branch of the imperial Habsburg-Lorraine. The Mayr von Melnhof family were Catholic Styrians since the 15th century and, having become industrialists, were ennobled with the title of Baron in Austria in 1859.

She started a career as a professional photographer and archived about 300,000 of her photos until her 100th birthday in December 2019. She photographed celebrities from Maria Callas to Gianni Agnelli to Luciano Pavarotti and published travel reports.

She was given the name "Mamarazza" based on the word "paparazzo" as a nickname from Princess Caroline of Monaco, who once said to her: "Manni, you are a real Mamarazza." In contrast to paparazzi shows but she never took indiscreet or derogatory photos: "I always photographed my friends as friends."

Marriage and children 
Baroness Marianne married Ludwig, 6th Prince zu Sayn-Wittgenstein-Sayn on 12 March 1942 in Glanegg, who was born in 1915 and died accidentally at Sayn in 1962. They had five children:
Princess Yvonne (born 9 December 1942) married firstly in 1962 Alfons, Count von Coreth zu Coredo und Starkenberg (born 1930), a photographer who served as honorary Thai consul in Salzburg (divorced 1970), and married secondly in 1976 physician Klaus Bolzano, Edler von Kronstätt (born 1936), and has issue from both marriages;
Alexander, 7th Prince zu Sayn-Wittgenstein-Sayn (born 22 November 1943) married Countess Gabriela von Schönborn-Wiesentheid (born 16 October 1950) in 1969, and they have issue;
Princess Elisabeth (born 1 April 1948) married bank manager Hasso, Baron Schuler von Senden (born 30 January 1943) in 1970, and they have issue;
Princess Teresa (born 25 April 1952) married firstly in 1973 Don Luis de Figueroa y Griffith, Count of Quintanilla (born 5 February 1950) (divorced 1983), son of author Aline Griffith, Dowager Countess of Romanones, and married secondly attorney Count Karl-Erbo von Kageneck in 1983, and has issue from both marriages;
Prince Peter (born 22 January 1954) married in 1993 actress Sunnyi Melles (born 7 Oct 1958), daughter of Austrian orchestral conductor Carl Melles and Judith von Rohonczy. They have issue.

Ancestry

References

1919 births
Living people
German centenarians
German photographers
German women photographers
People from Salzburg
German princesses
House of Sayn-Wittgenstein
Women centenarians